Iván Menczel (14 December 1941 – 26 November 2011) was a Hungarian football midfielder and Olympic champion. Menczel won the Olympic Games title in Mexico City in 1968, and in addition he was member of the  Hungarian team which participated at the 1962 FIFA World Cup. He also played for Salgótarjáni BTC.

References

External links
 FIFA profile

1941 births
2011 deaths
Hungarian footballers
Association football midfielders
1962 FIFA World Cup players
Olympic footballers of Hungary
Footballers at the 1968 Summer Olympics
Olympic gold medalists for Hungary
Olympic medalists in football
Medalists at the 1968 Summer Olympics
Sportspeople from Nógrád County